Brama - is a Polish coat of arms. It was used by several szlachta families during the Polish–Lithuanian Commonwealth.

History

Blazon

Notable bearers
Notable bearers of this coat of arms include:
 Edward Jełowicki, officer, engineer and inventor
 Aleksander Jełowicki, insurgent, poet, editor, writer and priest

Puzyna coat of arms (Brama odm. Puzyna)
Puzyna.
Notable bearers of this coat of arms include:
 Prince Jan Maurycy Paweł Cardinal Puzyna de Kosielsko

Sources

See also
 Polish heraldry
 Heraldry
 Coat of arms

Polish coats of arms